William Hawes M.D. (1736–1808) was an English physician and philanthropist, founder of the Royal Humane Society. As well as his work to spread the practice of resuscitation, he was concerned to relieve poverty in east London.

Life
Hawes was born at Islington, London, on 28 November 1736, and was educated at first by John Shield, and afterwards at St Paul's School, London. After passing some time with Mr. Robert Carsan, a medical practitioner of Vauxhall, he became assistant to a Mr. Dicks in the Strand and eventually succeeded him in his practice.

About 1773 Hawes became well known as a campaigner for the possibility of resuscitating persons apparently dead from drowning, or other causes of asphyxia. For a year he gave a reward to anyone who brought to him, or his supporters, the body of a person who had been taken out of the River Thames insensible, within a reasonable time after immersion. The reward was paid whether the attempt to resuscitate proved successful or not. Thomas Cogan, who translated in 1773 an account of an Amsterdam society for the resuscitation of the apparently drowned, thought that Hawes should not pay all the rewards, and it was arranged in 1774 that he and Cogan should each bring fifteen friends to the Chapter coffee-house on Paternoster Row to consider further operations. This was done, and at the meeting the Humane Society was formed. Hawes became its registrar.

Hawes was also physician to the London Dispensary. From 1791 he lived in Spital Square, and in 1793 worked to alleviate the distress which then was found among Spitalfields weavers. He died 5 December 1808.

Works
Hawes wrote the following works:

 An Account of Dr. Goldsmith's Illness, 1774. Oliver Goldsmith had consulated Hawes as apothecary, but against his advice continued to self-medicate with Dr James's "fever powder".
 An Examination of the Rev. John Wesley's Primitive Physic, 1776; 3rd ed. 1780. 
 An Address on Premature Death and Premature Interment, 1777. 
 An Address to the Public on the Dangerous Custom of laying out persons as soon as Respiration ceases, with a Reply by W. Renwick, and Observations on that Reply, 1778. 
 An Address to the Legislature on the importance of a Humane Society, 1781. 
 An Address to the King and Parliament of Great Britain on the important subject of preserving the Lives of its Inhabitants, 1782; 3rd ed., with Observations on the General Bills of Mortality, 1783. 
 The Transactions of the Royal Humane Society from 1774 to 1784, with an Appendix of Miscellaneous Observations on Suspended Animation to the year 1794.

Family
Hawes married Sarah Fox (1740–1814) in 1759, and they had nine children. They included:

Harriot (bap. 1760)
Sophia (bap. 1762, died 1828), married in 1790 Russell Scott (1761–1833), a nonconformist minister in Portsmouth and brother of Mary Scott. Their daughter Sophia Russell Scott married her first cousin John Edward Taylor, son of Mary Scott and founder of the Manchester Guardian; and her brother Russell (1810–1880) was father of C. P. Scott, editor of The Guardian. 
The eldest son, Thomas (bap. 1765, died 1849), a magistrate, was partner with his brother Benjamin in the soapworks at the New Barge House, Lambeth.
Sarah (b. 1773)
William (b. 1774)
Benjamin (1770–1861), the father of Benjamin Hawes (1797–1862) and William Hawes (1805–1885).
Maria, or Mary Ann (b. 1782), married John Gurney.

Notes

Attribution

1736 births
1808 deaths
18th-century English medical doctors
People from Islington (district)
People educated at St Paul's School, London